Terry's Texas Rangers Monument is an outdoor memorial commemorating Terry's Texas Rangers, a regiment of the Confederate Army installed on the Texas State Capitol grounds in Austin, Texas, United States. The monument was designed by Pompeo Coppini and erected in 1907.

Content
It features a bronze ranger on a horse. The base features quotes praising the Texas Rangers from President of the Confederate States, Jefferson Davis, and Confederate Officer Braxton Bragg.

See also

 1907 in art
 Lost Cause of the Confederacy
 List of Confederate monuments and memorials

References

External links
 

1907 establishments in Texas
1907 sculptures
Bronze sculptures in Texas
Confederate States of America monuments and memorials in Texas
Equestrian statues in Texas
Monuments and memorials in Texas
Outdoor sculptures in Austin, Texas
Sculptures of men in Texas